The Marie Curie-Skłodowska Medal is a Polish annual science award conferred by the Polish Chemical Society (Polskie Towarzystwo Chemiczne, PTCHEM) to scientists working permanently abroad for contributions in the field of chemistry.

Description
It was named in honour of physicist Marie Curie (1867–1934) and first awarded in 1996. The winner receives a bronze medal depicting Marie Curie and on the reverse the Latin inscription Quo Magis Veritas Propagatur as well as the PTCHEM logo, year and the name of the laureate. Three laureates of the medal have also been awarded the Nobel Prize in Chemistry: Roald Hoffmann (1981), Ada Yonath (2009) and Ben Feringa (2016).

Laureates
The winners of the award so far have been:

 Jean Marie Lehn (2022)
Volodymyr M. Gun’ko, (2021)
Karl Anker Jørgensen, (2020)
Roald Hoffmann, (2019) 
Jacek Klinowski, (2018)
Krzysztof Palczewski, (2017)
Mietek Jaroniec, (2016)
Janusz Pawliszyn, (2015)
John Joule, (2014)
Bernard L. Feringa, (2013)
Krzysztof Matyjaszewski, (2012)
Roland Boese, Nicole J. Moreau and Ada Yonath (2011)
Anton Amann, (2010)
Jerzy Leszczyński, (2007)
Tadeusz Maliński, (2005)
Ivar Olovsson, (2003)
Vilim Simanek, (2002)
Gerald Djega-Mariadassou and Józef Hurwic, (2001)
Gerard Descotes and Christian Reichardt, (2000)
Philip Kocienski, (1997)
Lodovico R. di Sanseverino, (1996)

See also
Prize of the Foundation for Polish Science
Marian Smoluchowski Medal

References

Chemistry awards
Polish awards
Polish science and technology awards